Ali Amin Khan Gandapur is a Pakistani politician who was the former Federal Minister for Kashmir Affairs and Gilgit-Baltistan, from 5 October 2018 to 10 April 2022. He had been a member of the National Assembly of Pakistan from August 2018 till January 2023.

Previously, he was a member of the Provincial Assembly of Khyber Pakhtunkhwa from 2013 to 2018 and served as Provincial Minister of Khyber Pakhtunkhwa for Revenue for the same period of time. He contested his first election in 2013 for PK 94 Dera Ismail Khan  and won and later on in 2018. He contested 2 seats PK-97 Dera Ismail Khan City 1 and NA-38 and won both seats. He kept the national assembly seat and his brother Sardar Faisal Amin Khan Gandapur is the MPA of PK-97 Dera Ismail Khan City 1.

Education
He has done his earlier studies in St. Helens School in Dera Ismail Khan. Due to his keen interest in sports as he was a player of squash he shifted to Peshawar and did his matric from Police Model School. He studied textile designing at the National College of Arts and Pakistan Institute of Fashion and Design in Lahore. He did his BA from Gomal University in Dera Ismail Khan.

Political career
He was elected to the Provincial Assembly of Khyber Pakhtunkhwa as a candidate of Pakistan Tehreek-e-Insaf (PTI) from the Constituency PK-64 (Dera Ismail Khan-I) in 2013 Pakistani general election. He received 14,047 votes and defeated an independent candidate, Qayyum Nawaz. Following his successful election, he was inducted into the provincial Khyber Pakhtunkhwa cabinet of Chief Minister Pervez Khattak and was made Provincial Minister of Khyber Pakhtunkhwa for Revenue and Estate.

He was elected to the National Assembly of Pakistan as a candidate of PTI from Constituency NA-38 (Dera Ismail Khan-I) in 2018 Pakistani general election.

On 5 October 2018, he was inducted into the federal cabinet of Prime Minister Imran Khan and was appointed Federal Minister for Kashmir Affairs and Gilgit-Baltistan.

References 

Pakistan Tehreek-e-Insaf MNAs
Living people
Pashtun people
Khyber Pakhtunkhwa MPAs 2013–2018
Pakistani MNAs 2018–2023
Provincial ministers of Khyber Pakhtunkhwa
Year of birth missing (living people)